The 1998–99 Pepsi Cup was a One Day International cricket tournament held in India in March - April 1999. It was a tri-nation series between the India, Pakistan and Sri Lanka. Pakistan defeated India in the final to win the tournament.

Matches

1st ODI

2nd ODI

3rd ODI

4th ODI

5th ODI

6th ODI

Final

Notes

References

External links
 Series home at ESPN Cricinfo

1999 in Indian cricket
International cricket competitions from 1997–98 to 2000
One Day International cricket competitions
PepsiCo